Gegenes niso, the common Hottentot skipper or plain Hottentot skipper, is a butterfly of the family Hesperiidae. It is found in Africa. It is found in a wide range of habitats, including savanna, grassland and open patches in forests.

The wingspan is 29–33 mm for males and 29–35 mm for females. Adults are on the wing year-round in warmer areas (with a peak from October to March) and from October to March in cooler areas.

The larvae feed on various grass species, namely Ehrharta species (including Ehrharta erecta), Pennisetum clandestinum, Zea and Cynodon species.

Subspecies
Gegenes niso niso
Range: southern Mozambique, Zimbabwe, Botswana, Namibia, Eswatini, Lesotho and South Africa, where it occurs in Limpopo, Mpumalanga, North West, Gauteng, Free State, KwaZulu-Natal, Eastern and Western Cape provinces
Gegenes niso brevicornis (Plötz, 1884) – plain Hottentot
Range: west, central and east Africa, including Senegal, Gambia, Guinea-Bissau, Guinea, Sierra Leone, Liberia, Ivory Coast, Ghana, Nigeria and Zambia

References

Hesperiinae
Butterflies described in 1764
Butterflies of Africa
Taxa named by Carl Linnaeus